The fifth World Series of Poker Europe (WSOPE) took place from October 7, 2011 to October 20, 2011. There were seven bracelet events, culminating in the  €10,400 WSOPE Championship No-Limit Hold'em event. Events were held at the Majestic Barrière Cannes and the Le Croisette Casino Barrière in Cannes, France. The 7 official gold bracelet events were complemented by a total of 51 other events in the two-week schedule, the most prominent of which is the €550 Ladies only event. ESPN broadcast the Main Event on its worldwide television network, and all official gold bracelet events streamed live on WSOP.com.

The first four WSOPEs were held at the Casino at the Empire in Leicester Square, London, making 2011 the first WSOPE not held in London and the first whose buy-ins and prize funds were fixed in euros instead of British pounds. 2011 marks the first time that the WSOP Player of the Year Award included all open bracelet events at both the WSOP and the WSOPE, meaning that the results of the 2011 WSOPE and those of the 2011 World Series of Poker are being combined to determine the player of the year. The 2011 WSOP Europe main event was an 8-handed event.

Event schedule

Main Event
The 2011 World Series of Poker Europe Main Event ran from October 15-20. The event drew 593 entrants, creating a prize pool of €5,692,800. The top 64 players made the money, with the winner earning €1,400,000.

Final table

*-Career statistics before start of 2011 WSOPE Main Event

Final Table results

Notes

World Series of Poker Europe
2011 in poker